Gwanmun-daero (Busan City Expressway No.3 and Busan Metropolitan City Line No.33) is the city expressway located in Busan, South Korea. The road opened on December 10, 2001 connecting Busan Harbor Part 5 ~ Sujeong Tunnel ~ Gaya Viaduct ~ Busanjin-gu Danggam-dong ~ Baekyang Tunnel ~ Mora Overpass ~ Samrak IC.

History 
26 July 2001: Designated 13.8 km (8.57 mi) section route by Busan Metropolitan City Line No. 33, Urban Expressway No.3 (Gwanmun-daero)
21 March 2007: Designated 10.8 km (6.71 mi) section of Beomil-dong, Dong-gu, Busan Metropolitan City ~ Samrak IC as motorway except for the 2.34 km (1.45 mi) section in front of Gaewon Elementary School in Danggam-dong ~ Baekyang Tunnel ~ in front of Mosan Elementary School in Mora 3-dong
27 December 2017: Changed route extension from 13.8 km (8.57 mi) to 10.8 km (6.71 mi)

Compositions

Capacity 
The road includes multiple lanes in each direction, viz:

Busan Harbor Part 5: Sujeong Tunnel ~ Gaewon Elementary School : 2 Lanes
Gaewon Elementary School: Gukjebaekyang Apartment : 3 lanes (Pedestrian·Bicycle Road included)
Baekyang Tunnel: 2 Lanes
Baekyang Tunnel: Mora Overpass ~ Samrak IC : 3 Lanes

Tunnel
2 sections (Sujeong Tunnel, Baekyang Tunnel)

Facilities 

 IC: Interchange, IS: Intersection, TG: Toll Gate, TN: Tunnel, BR: Bridge
 Blue Section (■): motorway section

References

2001 establishments in South Korea
Roads in Busan
Expressways in South Korea